The Grand River is a tributary of Lake Erie, 102.7 miles (165.3 km) long, in northeastern Ohio in the United States. Via Lake Erie, the Niagara River and Lake Ontario, it is part of the watershed of the St. Lawrence River, which flows to the Atlantic Ocean. It drains an area of 712 mi² (1844 km²).

The Grand River begins in southeastern Geauga County and initially flows eastward into Trumbull County. Downstream of West Farmington it turns northward into Ashtabula County County, where it flows through the village of Rock Creek and then turns westward into Lake County, where it flows through the communities of Painesville and Grand River before flowing into Lake Erie in Fairport Harbor.

Watershed description

On January 17, 1974, the Grand River became Ohio's second wild and scenic river. Designated sections include: from Harpersfield covered bridge downstream to the Norfolk and Western Railway trestle south of Painesville (wild,  and from the US 322 in Ashtabula County downstream to Harpersfield covered bridge (scenic). The Grand Wild and Scenic River represents one of the finest examples of a natural stream to be found anywhere in Ohio. Due to its rugged topography, the Grand River has not until recently felt the influences of urbanization. During the Pleistocene or Ice Age, the Wisconsinan glacier spread over Ohio in lobes, one of which is known as the Grand River lobe. This lobe ground and scraped its way south across northeastern Ohio, but was halted by the steep, erosion-resistant sandstone hills found to the south.

The upper portion of the Grand River in Ashtabula County is designated scenic. The river is bordered in many areas by extensive swamp forests of elm, ash, maple, pine, pin oak and swamp white oak. The slow flow of this section of the river along with the adjoining wetlands provides excellent habitat for a number of wildlife species, especially river otters, which have made a strong comeback after their reintroduction by the Division of Wildlife in 1986 and 1988. The lower section of the Grand River in Lake County is designated wild. Here, the river is characterized by steeply-incised valley walls of Chagrin Shale. A view of the river in this area following spring and summer showers has many waterfalls cascading over the steep shale bluffs. Insuring the natural heritage of the Grand River is not limited to protecting the immediate streamside environment. Land use activities within the watershed; such as urban and residential development may have a direct and adverse effect on the long-term protection and preservation of this important Ohio water resource. The Grand River has the most aquatic diversity of any Ohio Lake Erie tributary. The Grand River has an active partnership group working with the state scenic rivers program and other agencies to assist with the rivers preservation.

2006 flood
On July 28, 2006, the Grand River overflowed its banks and caused a state of emergency in Lake County and Ashtabula County due to flooding. The river reached 11 feet above flood level, a 500-year flood, due to a 1,000-year 48-hour rain. The flooding was so powerful that it caused a tributary (Paine Creek) to change course in at least one location. The area was subsequently declared a Federal Disaster area.

History
The first settlers of the Western Reserve landed at Fairport Harbor before they began the overland portion of their journey South to settlements such as Burton.

Variant names
According to the Geographic Names Information System, the Grand River has also been known historically as:
 Grande Riviere
 Chereage River
 Chocago River
 Chogage River
 Geauga River
 Geaugah River
 Riviere Charage
 Sheauga River

Tributaries
The principal tributaries by length are Mill Creek , Rock Creek , and Big Creek .

East Shore
 Red Creek
 Coffee Creek (Austinburg)
 Mill Creek (Austinburg)
 Three Brothers Creek
 Rock Creek
 Baughman Creek
 Deacon Creek
 Center Creek
 Mud Run
 Dead Branch

West Shore
 Big Creek
 Kellogg Creek
 Paine Creek
 Talcott Creek
 Griswold Creek
 Mill Creek (Madison)
 Bronson Creek
 Trumbull Creek
 Mud Creek
 Hoskins Creek
 Phelps Creek
 Mill Creek (Mesopotamia)
 Swine Creek
 Coffee Creek (Mesopotamia)

See also
 List of rivers of Ohio
 Grand River Valley AVA
 Interstate 90 Grand River bridges

References

External links

Rivers of Ohio
Rivers of Ashtabula County, Ohio
Rivers of Geauga County, Ohio
Rivers of Lake County, Ohio
Rivers of Trumbull County, Ohio
Tributaries of Lake Erie